State Tower is a skyscraper located on Silom Road, Bang Rak business district, Bangkok, Thailand, adjacent to Charoen Krung Road. It is also the tallest mixed-use building in Thailand.

Conceived by Thai architect Professor Rangsan Torsuwan in the early 1990s and designed by Rangsan Architecture, the massive building is characterised by its thirty-meter tall golden rooftop dome and neo-classical balconies. It was originally named "Silom Precious Tower", later "Royal Charoen Krung Tower" (RCK Tower) and then "State Tower".

State Tower contains condominiums, serviced apartments, offices and retail units. It is also home to two five-star hotels, lebua at State Tower and Tower Club at lebua. Sirocco, an open-air restaurant with a panoramic view of Bangkok, is located on the 63rd floor. There are two Michelin starred restaurants on the top floors of the tower, owned and managed by lebua Hotels and Resorts. 

State Tower is owned by Challenge Group. In 2015, Nusasiri PLC bought non-performing condominium units from Bangkok Commercial Asset Management Co and renovated for resell. The total units bought was 166 spanning floors 28-32 and 42-50.

See also
List of tallest buildings in Thailand
Sathorn Unique Tower, similarly designed sister building which remains unfinished

References

External links
 Tower Club at lebua
 lebua at State Tower
Chef's Table, Michelin Guide Thailand, 2021
Mezzaluna, Michelin Guide Thailand, 2021 

Skyscrapers in Bangkok
Bang Rak district
Skyscraper hotels in Thailand
Residential skyscrapers in Thailand

Buildings and structures completed in 2001
Postmodern architecture in Thailand